Esma Aydemir (born January 1, 1992 in Karakeçili, Kırıkkale Province, Turkey) is a Turkish middle distance and long-distance runner competing mostly in the 1500 m, 3000 m, 5000 m, 10,000 m and marathon events.

She began with running in Karakeçili town of Kırıkkale Province in 2005, discovered by Mehmet Kiper, national athlete and a physical education teacher in Antalya. With her parents permission, she followed him to Antalya, where she is trained by him. Currently, Esma Aydemir is a student at the Pamukkale University's Physical Education and Sports Technology Department. She ia sponsored by the regional union of the Agriculture Credit Cooperative in Kütahya.

She won the silver medal in the 3000 m and the gold medal in the 5000 m event at the 2011 European Athletics Junior Championships held in Tallinn, Estonia.

Esma Aydemir is the holder of the  national record in 1-mile race with  4:31.28 set in 2012. She won the silver medal in the 4 × 400 m relay event with her teammates Özge Akın, Birsen Engin and Sema Apak at the 2013 Islamic Solidarity Games held in Palembang, Indonesia.

Running marathon for the first time in her life, Aydemri took part at the 2016 Rotterdam Marathon and secured a slot for the 2016 Summer Olympics ranking 8th in the women's category with her time of 2:35:21. She won the gold medal at the 2016 European Cup 10,000m held in Mersin, Turkey.

Achievements

References

External links
 

1992 births
People from Karakeçili
Living people
Turkish female middle-distance runners
Turkish female long-distance runners
Turkish female marathon runners
European champions for Turkey
Athletes (track and field) at the 2016 Summer Olympics
Olympic athletes of Turkey
Universiade medalists in athletics (track and field)
Universiade silver medalists for Turkey
Medalists at the 2017 Summer Universiade
Islamic Solidarity Games competitors for Turkey